Thomas Aston may refer to:

Thomas Aston (died 1413), MP for Staffordshire
Thomas Aston (died 1553) (c. 1483–1553) of Aston, was a Sheriff of Cheshire in 1551
Sir Thomas Aston, 1st Baronet (1600–1645), English politician
Sir Thomas Aston, 3rd Baronet (1656–1725) of the Aston baronets
Sir Thomas Aston, 4th Baronet (c. 1705–1744) of the Aston Baronets
Tommy Aston (born 1876), English footballer

See also
Thomas Ashton (disambiguation)